In computational complexity theory, the complexity class ESPACE is the set of decision problems that can be solved by a deterministic Turing machine in space 2O(n).

See also EXPSPACE.

External links
 

Complexity classes